Mathys Tel (born 27 April 2005) is a French professional footballer who plays as a forward for Bundesliga club Bayern Munich. Known for his pace and creative dribbling ability, Tel has drawn comparisons to his French compatriot Kylian Mbappé.

Club career

Rennes 
A former youth academy player of Paris FC, Tel joined Rennes in 2020. He made his professional debut on 15 August 2021 in a 1–1 league draw against Brest. His debut at 16 years and 110 days made him the youngest player to appear in an official match for Rennes, a record which was previously held by Eduardo Camavinga.

Bayern Munich 
On 26 July 2022, Tel signed for Bundesliga club Bayern Munich on a five-year contract. The transfer fee paid to Rennes was of €28.5 million, bonuses included. On 31 August 2022, he scored his first goal in a 5–0 win over Viktoria Köln in the DFB-Pokal, to become the youngest goalscorer for the club in a competitive match, aged 17 years and 126 days. He scored his first Bundesliga goal in a 2–2 draw against Stuttgart on 10 September 2022, to be the youngest scorer for the club in that competition.

International career
Tel is a current French youth international.

Personal life
Born in mainland France, Tel is of Guadeloupean descent.

Career statistics

Honours
France U17
UEFA European Under-17 Championship: 2022

References

External links
 Profile at the FC Bayern Munich website
 
 
 

2005 births
Living people
People from Sarcelles
French footballers
France youth international footballers
French people of Guadeloupean descent
Association football forwards
Ligue 1 players
Championnat National 3 players
Bundesliga players
Paris FC players
Stade Rennais F.C. players
FC Bayern Munich footballers
Footballers from Val-d'Oise
French expatriate footballers
Expatriate footballers in Germany
French expatriate sportspeople in Germany